Anthony Ray Hinton (born June 1, 1956) is an American activist, writer, and author who was wrongly convicted of the 1985 murders of two fast food restaurant managers in Birmingham, Alabama. Hinton was sentenced to death and held on the state's death row for 28 years before his 2015 release.

In 2014 the Supreme Court of the United States unanimously overturned his conviction on appeal, after which the state dropped all charges against him. The court was unable to affirm the forensic evidence of a gun, which was the only evidence in the first trial. After being released, Hinton wrote and published a memoir The Sun Does Shine: How I Found Life and Freedom on Death Row (2018). Hinton was portrayed by O'Shea Jackson Jr. in the 2019 film Just Mercy.

Background
On February 25, 1985, and July 2, 1985, two fast food managers, John Davidson and Thomas Wayne Vason, were killed in separate incidents during armed robberies at their fast food restaurants in Birmingham. A survivor of a third restaurant robbery picked a photo of Anthony Ray Hinton, then age 29, from a lineup, and the police investigated him. At the time, Hinton worked at a supermarket warehouse and lived with his mother, Buhlar Hinton, at her home in rural Alabama, about half an hour north of Birmingham.

Arrest, prosecution, and conviction
After Hinton's arrest, his public defense attorney did not provide adequate counsel. He said to Hinton, "All of y'all blacks always say you didn’t do something." and "Y'all blacks always sticking up for each other." The credibility of his ballistics expert - the only one the attorney thought he could hire with the funds available - was discredited by the prosecutor due to the expert's physical limitations and lack of experience. The jury disregarded the testimony of Hinton's boss, who testified that he was at work during the time of the alleged crimes.

The prosecution's only evidence at the trial was a statement that ballistics tests showed four crime scene bullets matched Hinton's mother's gun, which was discovered at her house during the investigation. No fingerprints or eyewitness testimony were introduced. Hinton was convicted of each of the two murders and sentenced to death.

In June 1988, the unanimous Alabama Court of Criminal Appeals affirmed Hinton's conviction and death sentence. In June 1989, that judgment was affirmed by the unanimous Supreme Court of Alabama.

Death row
Hinton was sent to death row, where he was held in solitary confinement for nearly three decades. During his decades in prison, he was supported by his mother's faith in his innocence, as well as that of a longtime friend, Lester Bailey, who visited him monthly. Hinton's mother died in 2002.

While on death row, Hinton spent much of his time reading. He organized a book club that was allowed to meet in the prison's law library. Among the authors whom the prisoners read and discussed were James Baldwin and Harper Lee. After a few years, the club grew as the news spread quickly in the prison that reading was a good escape. However, the number of members also gradually became smaller when book club members were executed. A total of 54 men walked past Hinton's cell on their way to execution. Hinton would smell burning flesh from the electric chair, also called Yellow Mama, because it was close to his cell. Finally, Hinton was the last prisoner left on death row.

Appeals
Hinton's initial appeals continued to be handled by his public defender, Sheldon C. Perhacs, who lost each of Hinton’s cases. Perhacs hired a civil engineer who had impaired vision and didn’t have any forensic experience. The engineer said that there wasn’t any connection between the weapon and the shooting. However, the jury disregarded his testimony because of his poor eyesight and inability to use the microscope correctly.

Doug Acker, a detective, attempted to persuade Hinton to sign a blank sheet of paper telling him [Hinton] that it was just to confirm that he had already read his rights.  Hinton declined to sign it.

Additionally, Hinton’s boss testified that Hinton was working at the time of the incident, and that he was cleaning the supermarket; despite this, the jury still convicted him.

After Hinton had been on death row for about a decade, Bryan Stevenson at the Equal Justice Initiative (EJI), a non-profit based in Montgomery, Alabama, picked up his case, handling his defense for 16 years. During the appeals, EJI introduced evidence from three forensic experts, including one from the FBI, showing that the bullets from the crime scenes did not match Hinton's mother's gun. But the state court of Alabama refused to overturn his convictions or grant a new trial.

Exoneration, release and aftermath
In February 2014, the Supreme Court of the United States vacated the state court conviction in a unanimous per curiam decision. The Court ruled that Hinton's original defense lawyer had provided "constitutionally deficient" ineffective assistance of counsel, and remanded his case to the Alabama state court for retrial. Hinton's original defense lawyer had wrongly thought he had only $1,000 available to hire a ballistics expert to rebut the state’s case on evidence. The only expert willing to testify at that price was a civil engineer with very little ballistics training and limited by having one eye; he admitted in court to having trouble in operating the microscope.

In November 2014, the Alabama Court of Criminal Appeals closed Hinton's case. On April 1, 2015 the Jefferson County district attorney’s office moved to drop the case. Their forensics experts were unable to match crime-scene bullets to Hinton's mother's gun. Prosecutors admitted that they could not match four bullets found at the crime scene with Hinton's mother's gun, and that this was the only evidence offered in the original murder trial.

On April 3, 2015, Hinton was released from prison after Laura Petro, a Jefferson County Circuit Court judge, overturned his conviction and the state dropped all charges against him.

Hinton is the 152nd person since 1973 to be exonerated from death row in the United States, and the sixth in the state of Alabama. He said, “Everybody that played a part in sending me to death row, you will answer to God.” Hinton filed a claim for nearly $1.5 million in compensation for his time in jail due to the wrongful conviction. The legislature has resisted approval of this payment, as state authorities say that he did not prove his innocence.

Since his release, Hinton has spoken in various venues about the injustices of the Alabama judicial system and other issues related to his conviction and imprisonment. He has spoken out against the death penalty, calling it a "form of lynching." He completed a memoir entitled The Sun Does Shine: How I Found Life and Freedom on Death Row (2018), and has given readings and talks around the country about the book and his experiences. Hinton's book received extremely positive reviews. Writing for The Guardian, Tim Adams described the book as, "a story of forgiveness and struggle" and concludes that, "his wonderful memoir recreates the ways he escaped from his cell in his head – had tea with the Queen of England, married Halle Berry – and how he shared that possibility with his fellow death row inmates." Kirkus Reviews calls the book, "a heart-wrenching yet ultimately hopeful story about truth, justice, and the need for criminal justice reform."

On May 19, 2019, Hinton spoke at St. Bonaventure University's commencement exercises and was awarded an honorary Doctor of Human Letters degree. He had previously spoken to the students of the Class of 2019, six months after his release, in 2015. The students had been so inspired by his earlier address that over 100 of them submitted a petition to the university administration, asking that he be invited to speak at commencement.

See also 
 Capital punishment in the United States
 List of exonerated death row inmates
 List of wrongful convictions in the United States

References

External links

 Case page at the Equal Justice Initiative
 The Death Row book club (27 min.) from the BBC World Service
 "They Couldn’t Take My Soul": Anthony Ray Hinton on His Exoneration After 30 Years on Death Row, Democracy Now! (2015)
 
 Interview with Megyn Kelly, Today show
 Ray Hinton, The Sun Does Shine, Macmillan Company

Capital punishment in Alabama
Overturned convictions in the United States
Place of birth missing (living people)
Living people
American people wrongfully convicted of murder
1956 births
Anti–death penalty activists
American anti–death penalty activists
21st-century American non-fiction writers
African-American non-fiction writers
African-American activists
Activists from Alabama
Writers from Alabama
21st-century African-American writers
20th-century African-American people